Koltermann Peak is a peak rising to  in the eastern part of the McAllister Hills, located west of the Olympus Range in Victoria Land, Antarctica. It was named by the Advisory Committee on Antarctic Names (2004) after Major David Koltermann of the 109th Airlift Wing, New York Air National Guard, co-pilot of the LC-130 aircraft in a pre-season flight from McMurdo Station to South Pole Station, October 16, 1999.

References

Mountains of Victoria Land
McMurdo Dry Valleys